Crassicantharus is a genus of sea snails, marine gastropod mollusks in the family Pisaniidae

Species
Species within the genus Crassicantharus include:

 Crassicantharus aureatus Fraussen & Stahlschmidt, 2015
 Crassicantharus beslui Fraussen & Stahlschmidt, 2015
 Crassicantharus boutetorum Fraussen & Stahlschmidt, 2015
 Crassicantharus feoides Fraussen & Stahlschmidt, 2015
 Crassicantharus letourneuxi Fraussen & Stahlschmidt, 2015
 Crassicantharus magnificus Fraussen & Stahlschmidt, 2015
 Crassicantharus metallicus Fraussen & Stahlschmidt, 2015
 Crassicantharus mirabelkarinae Cossignani, 2015
 Crassicantharus nexus Fraussen & Stahlschmidt, 2015
 Crassicantharus norfolkensis Ponder, 1972 - type species of the genus Crassicantharus
 Crassicantharus noumeensis (Crosse, 1870) - Fraussen & Stahlschmidt (2015) classified this species as Turbinella noumeensis Crosse, 1870.
 Crassicantharus perlatus Fraussen & Stahlschmidt, 2015

Similar species:
 Fusus lincolnensis Crosse & Fischer, 1865 also possibly belong to the genus Crassicantharus.

References

 Ponder W.F. (1972). Notes on some Australian species and genera of the family Buccinidae (Neogastropoda). Journal of the Malacological Society of Australia. 2(3): 249-265. page(s): 262
 Fraussen K. & Stahlschmidt P. (2015). An extensive radiation of the genus Crassicantharus Ponder, 1972 (Gastropoda: Buccinoidea) in French Polynesia, with description of nine new species. Novapex. 16(3): 65-80

Pisaniidae